is a Japanese musical collective consisting of all female recording artists and groups under Up-Front Promotion, a subsidiary of Up-Front Group. The name was initially used as Michiyo Heike and Morning Musume's fan club name in 1999, but has since then been used to represent all female recording artists at Up-Front Promotion. Until 2014, their songs were primarily produced by Tsunku.

Hello! Project's main acts consist of Morning Musume, Angerme, Juice=Juice, Camellia Factory, Beyooooonds, and Ocha Norma. Notable acts in the past associated with Hello! Project include Aya Matsuura, Maki Goto, Mini-Moni, W, Melon Kinenbi, Berryz Kobo, and Cute.

Artists

Yuko Nakazawa was Hello! Project's leader from April 15, 2001 to March 31, 2009. Ai Takahashi became the group's leader from April 1, 2009 to September 30, 2011. Risa Niigaki then became the leader from October 1, 2011 to May 18, 2012. After her departure, Sayumi Michishige became the leader from May 19, 2012 to November 26, 2014. Maimi Yajima was the leader from November 27, 2014 to December 31, 2016. Ayaka Wada was the group's leader from January 1, 2017 to June 18, 2019, with Mizuki Fukumura as sub-leader. Fukumura took over the leader role beginning June 19, 2019.

History

1997–2000: Beginning, Michiyo Heike & Morning Musume
In 1997, Japanese rock group Sharam Q, fronted by Tsunku, began auditions for a female vocalist. These auditions aired via the reality show Asayan, and resulted in Michiyo Heike being crowned winner. Tsunku decided to give five of the runners-up, Yuko Nakazawa, Natsumi Abe, Kaori Iida, Asuka Fukuda and Aya Ishiguro, named "Morning Musume", a chance to become a group by selling 50,000 copies of their demo single "Ai no Tane" in just five days. The girls sold the required number of copies in four days, and subsequently became an official group.

Morning Musume's debut single, "Morning Coffee," was released on January 28, 1998 on the One Up Music label and charted at #6 on the Oricon weekly chart. The group's first official appearance was a joint live in August 1998, at Shibuya Public Hall (now Shibuya C.C. Lemon Hall), under the name  the fan club of the two acts was called "Hello!" The first official "units" were Tanpopo and Petitmoni, created in October 1998. The first "Michiyo Heike & Morning Musume Imotōbun Audition" took place, resulting in the "second generation" of Morning Musume to be added, made up of Sayaka Ichii, Mari Yaguchi and Kei Yasuda.

In April of that year the girls' official fan club was renamed "Hello! Project", a name which was later used to represent an enterprise of member-changing girl groups. Auditions were once again held on Asayan between April and July, resulting in Taiyō to Ciscomoon and Coconuts Musume, with Country Musume's official formation announced. In July, the first live concert of Hello! Project, "Hello! Project '99 at Yokohama Arena," was held. The first shuffle units were formed in March 2000, releasing the "theme" of Hello! Project as a B-side. The first Hello! Project television show, "Hello! Morning," was created in April.

2001–2006: Rise to popularity, Berryz Kobo & Cute
In March 2001, Morning Musume co-founder and leader Yuko Nakazawa announced her graduation from the group, which took place in April. Nakazawa was subsequently named as leader of the entirety of Hello! Project. Nakazawa's was the first graduation in the history of Hello! Project, and garnered considerable media attention as a result.

Between April and June 2002, auditions for Hello! Project Kids were held for girls under 12 years old. Out of 27,958 applicants, fifteen elementary school girls were chosen. After making minor appearances in television, film, and music, Hello! Project Kids later debuted as Berryz Kobo and Cute, who would go on to debut in March 2004 and February 2007 respectively, also spawning offshoot auditions such as auditions for Hello! Pro Egg and Hello! Project Kansai.

2007–2010: Expansion in Asia and Smileage formation

In 2007, Hello! Project attempted to expand towards the Chinese market by inviting prospective Chinese artists to audition in secret, eventually resulting in Li Chun and Qian Lin to Morning Musume's roster. Hello! Project also set up an overseas branch in Taiwan, titled Hello! Project Taiwan, and held the "Hello! Project New Star Audition" to recruit members. In September 2008, the group Ice Creamusume was formed under a Taiwanese-affiliated label as Hello! Project's first overseas group. Duo Frances & Aiko, later named Big Small Sister, was also announced from the same audition.

In February 2009, Hello! Project also held a series of auditions in South Korea with cooperation from Mnet. However, Hello! Project failed to break into the Chinese market due to piracy and their Chinese artists failing to draw an audience. Ice Creamusume also performed below expectations. Hello! Project scaled back on initial plans to expand overseas around 2010 and refocused their interests in Japan.

On October 19, 2008, Hello! Project announced its entire Elder Club would be graduating on March 31, 2009. On February 1, 2009, at the Yokohama Arena, Hello! Project held its largest concert ever—the —featuring 21 groups and 72 members. During the concert, former Hello! Project leader Yuko Nakazawa passed her leadership position to Morning Musume leader Ai Takahashi.

Later in 2009, several of the old, dormant units were revived. Tanpopo, Minimoni, Petitmoni, ZYX, Aa! and v-u-den all returned with new line-ups, and High-King returned from hiatus with its original members. These groups became a new concert unit, "Champloo".

In April 2009, Tsunku announced a new group consisting of four Hello! Pro Egg members, named Smileage, who later debuted on a major label in May 2010 with the single "Yume Miru 15".

2011–2014: Line-up and production changes

On January 28, 2011, Dream Morning Musume was formed consisting of previous Morning Musume members. On September 30, 2011, Ai Takahashi graduated and handed her position as leader of Morning Musume and Hello! Project over to fellow member Risa Niigaki, who also graduated on May 18, 2012. Sayumi Michishige was later named the group's new leader.

During the last concert of the Winter 2013 Hello! Project concert, Juice=Juice, a new unit consisting of Hello! Pro Kenshusei members was announced, They previewed their debut song at the Hello Project concert series held on March 2–3.

On November 26, 2014, Sayumi Michishige graduated and handed her position as Hello! Project's leader to C-ute's Maimi Yajima.

Tsunku revealed in his 2015 memoir, Dakara, Ikiru that he stepped down as Hello! Project's general manager sometime after Morning Musume's New York concert in 2014; however, he still remains involved with Morning Musume as their sound producer.

2015–Present: Post-Tsunku era 
On January 2, 2015, during the Hello! Project 2015 winter concert, a new group consisting of Hello Pro Kenshusei members was announced and was named Magnolia Factory. On April 29, 2015, Magnolia Factory's sister group, Camellia Factory was also formed.

Discography

Projects

 2000-2005: Hello! Project Shuffle Unit

Studio albums

 Chanpuru 1: Happy Marriage Song Cover Shu (2009)

Compilation albums

 Petit Best: Ki-Ao-Aka (2000)
 Petit Best 2: Mi-Nana-Juu (2001)
 Petit Best 3 (2002)
 Petit Best 4 (2003)
 Petit Best 5 (2004)
 Petit Best 6 (2005)
 Petit Best 7 (2006)
 Petit Best 8 (2007)
 Petit Best 9 (2008)
 Hello! Project Special Unit Mega Best (2008)
 Petit Best 10 (2009)
 Petit Best 11 (2010)
 Petit Best 12 (2011)
 Petit Best 13 (2012)
 Petit Best 14 (2013)
 Petit Best 15 (2014)
 Petit Best 16 (2015)
 Petit Best 17 (2016)
 Petit Best 18 (2017)
 Petit Best 19 (2018)
 Petit Best 20 2020 (2020)

Singles

 "All for One & One for All!" (2004) (as H.P. All Stars)
 "Busu ni Naranai Tetsugaku" (2011) (as Hello! Project Mobekimasu)

Filmography

Television

Radio 
 MBS Young Town Saturday on MBS Radio (the Kansai area)
 HelloPro Yanen! on ABC Radio

Internet
 Hello! Project Station (2013–)

Theatre 
 Princess Knight: The Musical (August 1, 2006 – August 27, 2006)
 Cinderella: The Musical (2008)
 Fashionable: The Musical (2010)

Sports festivals 
 Hello! Project Daiundōkai (March 31, 2001 at Saitama Super Arena)
 Hello! Project Daiundōkai (November 3, 2002 at Osaka Dome)
 Hello! Project Sports Festival 2003 (November 16, 2003 at Osaka Dome)
 Hello! Project Sports Festival 2003 (November 22, 2003 at Tokyo Dome)
 Hello! Project Sports Festival 2004 (November 14, 2004 at Toyota Stadium)
 Hello! Project Sports Festival 2004 (December 5, 2004 at Saitama Super Arena)
 Hello! Project Sports Festival 2006 ~Hello!Diva Athlete~ (March 19, 2006 at Saitama Super Arena)

Concerts

See also 
 Hello! Project's futsal team Gatas Brilhantes H.P.

References

External links 
  

 
Japanese pop music groups
Japanese girl groups
Musical collectives